Jaunsari may refer to:
 Jaunsari people, an ethnic group of northern India
 Jaunsari language, their language

Language and nationality disambiguation pages